The 1962 Akron Zips football team represented Akron University in the 1962 NCAA College Division football season as a member of the Ohio Athletic Conference. Led by second-year head coach Gordon K. Larson, the Zips played their home games at the Rubber Bowl in Akron, Ohio. They finished the season with a record of 7–2 overall and 7–1 in OAC play. They outscored their opponents 261–65.

Schedule

h

References

Akron
Akron Zips football seasons
Akron Zips football